More than Words is the fifth album released by Mark 'Oh, and it was released on February 16, 2004, by Home Records GmbH.

The album contains two cover songs, a cover of the song "Stuck on You", released by Lionel Richie in 1984, and a cover of "Get Here", released by Brenda Russell in 1988.

Track listing

Album credits
All songs on More than Words are produced by Mark 'Oh & André Schöttler

Words
Vocals By: Tjerk Schoonheim
Music and Words By: Mark 'Oh & André Schöttler
You
Vocals By: Diana Schneider
Music & Words By: Mark 'Oh & André Schöttler
Stuck on You
Vocals By: Martha Zaremba
Music & Words By: Lionel Richie
Get Here
Vocals By: Diana Schneider
Music & Words By: Brenda Russell
Fly Away
Vocals By: Cinzia Sollai
Music & Words By: Mark 'Oh & André Schöttler
Partytime On Planet Earth
Vocals By: Tjerk Schoonheim
Music & Words By: Mark 'Oh & André Schöttler
I Promise My Love
Vocals By: Diana Sorbello
Music & Words By: Mark 'Oh & André Schöttler
Mystic Symphony
Vocals By: Diana Sorbello
Music & Words By: Mark 'Oh & André Schöttler
Party Train
Vocals By: Diana Schneider
Music & Words By: Mark 'Oh & André Schöttler
Around The World
Vocals By: Monique Loswijk
Rap By: Rene Phillips
Music & Words By: Mark 'Oh & André Schöttler

References

External links

2004 albums
Marko Albrecht albums